Mahikeng Railway Station is the central railway station in the city of Mahikeng, South Africa, and one of the oldest railway stations in Africa. It is located on Station Road, Mahikeng Town.

A steel cover was put on in 1913 over the railway bridge on the Vryburg Road.

References

Railway stations in South Africa
Railway stations opened in 1885
Transport in North West (South African province)
Mahikeng